Restrictive cardiomyopathy (RCM) is a form of cardiomyopathy in which the walls of the heart are rigid (but not thickened). Thus the heart is restricted from stretching and filling with blood properly. It is the least common of the three original subtypes of cardiomyopathy: hypertrophic, dilated, and restrictive.

It should not be confused with constrictive pericarditis, a disease which presents similarly but is very different in treatment and prognosis.

Signs and symptoms
Untreated hearts with RCM often develop the following characteristics:
 M or W configuration in an invasive hemodynamic pressure tracing of the RA
 Square root sign of part of the invasive hemodynamic pressure tracing Of The LV
 Biatrial enlargement
 Thickened LV walls (with normal chamber size)
 Thickened RV free wall (with normal chamber size)
 Elevated right atrial pressure (>12mmHg),
 Moderate pulmonary hypertension,
 Normal systolic function,
 Poor diastolic function, typically Grade III - IV Diastolic heart failure.
Those affected by RCM will experience decreased exercise tolerance, fatigue, jugular venous distention, peripheral edema, and ascites. Arrhythmias and conduction blocks are common.

Causes
RCM can be caused by genetic or non-genetic factors. Thus it is possible to divide the causes into primary and secondary.  The common modern organization is into Infiltrative, storage diseases, non-infiltrative, and endomyocardial etiologies:
 Genetic
 DES (desmin) 
 CRYAB (alpha B Crystallin, HSPB5) 
 FLNC (filamin C) 
 Infiltrative
 Amyloidosis
 Sarcoidosis
 Primary hyperoxaluria
 Storage diseases
 Fabry disease
 Gaucher disease
 Hereditary hemochromatosis
 Glycogen storage disease
 Mucopolysaccharidosis type I (Hurler syndrome)
 Mucopolysaccharidosis type II (Hunter syndrome)
 Niemann-Pick disease
 Non-infiltrative
 Idiopathic
 Diabetic cardiomyopathy
 Scleroderma
 Myofibrillar myopathies
 Pseudoxanthoma elasticum
 Sarcomeric protein disorders
 Werner's syndrome
 Endomyocardial
 Carcinoid heart disease
 Endomyocardial fibrosis
 Idiopathic
 Hypereosinophilic syndrome
 Chronic eosinophilic leukemia
 Drugs (serotonin, methysergide, ergotamine, mercurial agents, busulfan)
 Endocardial fibroelastosis
 Consequence of cancer or cancer therapy
 Metastatic cancer
 Drugs (anthracyclines)
 Radiation

The most common cause of restrictive cardiomyopathy is amyloidosis.

Mechanism 
Rhythmicity and contractility of the heart may be normal, but the stiff walls of the heart chambers (atria and ventricles) keep them from adequately filling, reducing preload and end-diastolic volume. Thus, blood flow is reduced, and blood volume that would normally enter the heart is backed up in the circulatory system. In time, restrictive cardiomyopathy patients develop diastolic dysfunction and eventually heart failure.

Diagnosis 
Diagnosis is typically made via echocardiography. Patients will demonstrate normal systolic function, diastolic dysfunction, and a restrictive filling pattern. 2-dimensional and Doppler studies are necessary to distinguish RCM from constrictive pericarditis. Cardiac MRI and transvenous endomyocardial biopsy may also be necessary in some cases. Reduced QRS voltage on EKG may be an indicator of amyloidosis-induced restrictive cardiomyopathy.

Treatment
Treatment of restrictive cardiomyopathy should focus on management of causative conditions (for example, using corticosteroids if the cause is sarcoidosis), and slowing the progression of cardiomyopathy. Salt-restriction, diuretics, angiotensin-converting enzyme inhibitors, and anticoagulation may be indicated for managing restrictive cardiomyopathy.

Calcium channel blockers are generally contraindicated due to their negative inotropic effect, particularly in cardiomyopathy caused by amyloidosis. Digoxin, calcium channel blocking drugs and beta-adrenergic blocking agents provide little benefit, except in the subgroup of restrictive cardiomyopathy with atrial fibrillation. Vasodilators are also typically ineffective because systolic function is usually preserved in cases of RCM.

Heart failure resulting from restrictive cardiomyopathy will usually eventually have to be treated by cardiac transplantation or left ventricular assist device.

Epidemiology 
Endomyocardial fibrosis is generally limited to the tropics and sub-saharan Africa. The highest incidence of death caused by cardiac sarcoidosis is found in Japan.

References

External links 

 Overview at Merck Manual

Cardiomyopathy